The Resistance Medal 1940–1945 was a Belgian war medal established by royal decree of the Regent on 16 February 1946 and awarded to all members of the Belgian armed resistance during the Second World War and to members of the intelligence service who operated in occupied territories and participated in combat actions aimed at the liberation of Belgium.

Award description
The Resistance Medal 1940–1945 was a 39mm in diameter circular bronze medal. Its obverse bore the upper body of a young woman facing left in defiance with her right fist clenched. The reverse bore the relief inscription in Latin on three lines "1940 RESISTERE 1945" superimposed over a laurel wreath.

The medal was suspended by a ring through a suspension loop from a 37 mm wide black silk moiré ribbon with two central 1 mm wide red stripes 5 mm apart and 4 mm light green edge stripes. The colours of the ribbon were symbolic, the black denoting the dark days of the German occupation and/or the clandestine nature of the resistance, the green stood the hope of liberation and the red for the spilled blood of the resistance members.

Notable recipients (partial list)
The individuals listed below were awarded the Medal of the Armed Resistance:
Lieutenant General Ernest Engelen
Cavalry Major General Jules François Gaston Everaert
Lieutenant General Jules Joseph Pire
Lieutenant General Alphonse Verstraete
Lieutenant General Joseph Leroy
Cavalry Lieutenant General Jules De Boeck
Police Lieutenant General Louis Joseph Leroy
Achille van Acker
Edmond Leburton
Alfons Vranckx
Baron Albert Lilar
Count Harold d’Aspremont Lynden
Count Jean-Charles Snoy et d’Oppuers
Viscount Omer Vanaudenhove
Geraard van den Daele
Count Count Jean d’Ursel
Baron Pierre van Outryve d’Ydewalle
Count Charles of Limburg Stirum
 Robberechts Henri
 Marcel Verriest
 Josephine Baker

See also

Resistance during World War II
Resistance movement
List of Orders, Decorations and Medals of the Kingdom of Belgium

References

Other sources
 Quinot H., 1950, Recueil illustré des décorations belges et congolaises, 4e Edition. (Hasselt)
 Cornet R., 1982, Recueil des dispositions légales et réglementaires régissant les ordres nationaux belges. 2e Ed. N.pl., (Brussels)
 Borné A.C., 1985, Distinctions honorifiques de la Belgique, 1830–1985 (Brussels)

External links
Bibliothèque royale de Belgique (In French)
Les Ordres Nationaux Belges (In French)
ARS MORIENDI Notables from Belgian history (In French and Dutch)

Military awards and decorations of Belgium
Awards established in 1946
1946 establishments in Belgium